Backa Theatre (Swedish: Backa Teater) is a  youth theater located in Gothenburg, Sweden. 
It focuses on producing theater for  children and their families.

The theater was founded in 1978 by director Eva Bergman and actor Ulf Dohlsten as part of Gothenburg City Theatre. It is now led by  playwright, director Carl Mattias Andersson, who himself has background as an actor at Backa Theatre. The company has had the privilege to set up newly written plays, for example In a dark and northern place which was written by Mattias Andersson. The theatre moved into new premises on Gothenburg's northern riverbank during autumn 2007.

References

External links
Backa Teater website

Culture in Gothenburg
Theatres in Sweden
Youth theatre companies
Theatre companies in Sweden
Children's theatre